Cabinet Room may refer to:
Cabinet Room (10 Downing Street), the meeting place of the Cabinet of the United Kingdom.
Cabinet Room (White House), the meeting place of the Cabinet of the United States.
Cabinet (room), a private room in the domestic architecture and that of palaces of Early Modern Europe.

fr:Cabinet Room